Stand Up Rahul is a 2022 Indian Telugu-language coming of age romantic comedy film directed by debutant Santo.The film is produced jointly by Nandkumar Abbineni and Bharath Maguluri. The film stars Raj Tarun and Varsha Bollamma. The music is composed by Sweekar Agasthi. The film was released on 18 March 2022 coinciding with Holi festival.

Cast 
Raj Tarun as Rahul.
Varsha Bollamma as Sreya Rao.
Murali Sharma as Prakash, Rahul's father.
Indraja as Indu, Rahul's mother
Vennela Kishore as Steve Jags.
Venkatesh Maha as Hriday
Devi Prasad as Sreya's father
Rajkumar Kasireddy as Rahul's friend

Production 
Stand up Rahul began filming after the extended lockdown in 2020.

Reception 
Neeshita Nyayapati of The Times of India gave the film a rating of 2.5/5 and wrote "Stand Up Rahul is the kind of film you want to watch over a large tub of popcorn and while it might be flawed, it also works in bits and pieces. Watch it if breezy rom-coms are your thing". A reviewer of Pinkvilla gave the film a rating of 2/5 and wrote "In 'Stand Up Rahul', emotional monologues that should have been ideally spoken in private take the form of public whining - all in the name of stand-up comedy". A reviewer from The Hans India gave the film a rating of 2/5 and wrote "As a final note, “Stand Up Rahul is a youthful drama that has a few good moments to enjoy but lack of gripping scene order and abruptly written characterizations make the film a disappointing watch". Sangeetha Devi Dundoo of The Hindu stated "What could have been a refreshing coming-of-age romantic comedy gets marred by clumsy writing".

References

External links 

2020s Telugu-language films
2022 films
Indian romantic comedy films
2022 romantic comedy films
Films set in Hyderabad, India
Films shot in Hyderabad, India